The  was a two-row, 14-cylinder air-cooled radial engine built by Mitsubishi Heavy Industries and used in a variety of World War II Japanese aircraft, such as Mitsubishi J2M and Mitsubishi G4M. The Mitsubishi model designation for this engine was A10 while it was an experimental project, in service it was known as the MK4, and known as the Ha101 & Ha111 by the Army and Kasei by the Navy. According to unified designation code it was Ha-32 of the variants from 11 to 27.

Design and development
Although originally ordered by the Imperial Japanese Navy, the Kasei was based on the earlier Mitsubishi Shinten engine, itself based originally on the Mitsubishi Kinsei. Three variants were developed for the Japanese Navy starting in 1939. It was also later adopted by the Imperial Japanese Army as the Ha-101 engine. Unified code was Ha-32.

Its size and weight meant it was a challenging engine to use on single engine fighters.

Variants
 MK4A [Ha-32] 11
 MK4B [Ha-32] 12 - same as MK4A 11
 MK4C [Ha-32] 13 - with extended propeller shaft
 MK4D [Ha-32] 14 - with contra-rotating shafts
 MK4E [Ha-32] 15 - with improved altitude performance
 MK4P [Ha-32] 21
 MK4Q [Ha-32] 22 - same as MK4A 21
 MK4R [Ha-32] 23 - Water-injection
 MK4S [Ha-32] 24 - Same power as the MK4P 21 with contra-rotating shafts
 MK4T [Ha-32] 25 - ,
 MK4R [Ha-32] 26
 MK4U-4 [Ha-32] 26a - Mechanically driven 3-speed supercharger

 MK4V [Ha-32] 27

Applications
Kawanishi E15K
Kawanishi H8K
Kawanishi N1K 
Mitsubishi G4M 
Mitsubishi J2M 
Mitsubishi Ki-21
Nakajima B6N 
Nakajima G5N 
Yokosuka P1Y

Specifications (MK4V 27)

See also

References

Notes

Bibliography
 Matsuoka Hisamitsu, Nakanishi Masayoshi. The History of Mitsubishi Aero Engines 1915–1945. Miki Press, Japan, 2005. 

 Gunston, Bill. World Encyclopaedia of Aero Engines. Cambridge, England. Patrick Stephens Limited, 1989. 
 Jane's Fighting Aircraft of World War II. London. Studio Editions Ltd, 1989. 

Aircraft air-cooled radial piston engines
1930s aircraft piston engines
Kasei